Elliptochloris is a genus of green algae in the order  Prasiolales.

References

Prasiolales
Trebouxiophyceae genera